Dairin González (born 4 June 1990), is a Colombian footballer who last played for FC Košice as a defender.

References

External links

Futbalnet profile

1990 births
Living people
Sportspeople from Chocó Department
Colombian footballers
Colombian expatriate footballers
Association football defenders
Leones F.C. footballers
Fortaleza C.E.I.F. footballers
América de Cali footballers
Deportes Quindío footballers
La Equidad footballers
Atlético Bucaramanga footballers
Club Deportivo Guabirá footballers
Unión Magdalena footballers
FC Košice (2018) players
Categoría Primera B players
Categoría Primera A players
Bolivian Primera División players
2. Liga (Slovakia) players
Colombian expatriate sportspeople in Bolivia
Colombian expatriate sportspeople in Slovakia
Expatriate footballers in Bolivia
Expatriate footballers in Slovakia